On September 30, 2022, the Russian Armed Forces reportedly launched S-300 missiles at a civilian convoy, killing 32 people, both adults and children, and injuring 86 more. 

The Russian Armed Forces launched 16 S-300 on the outskirts of Zaporizhzhia, the capital of Zaporizhzhia Oblast. Four missiles hit the area next to the automotive market in the South-East of Zaporizhzia, where the humanitarian convoy of around 60 cars was forming before moving to the Russian checkpoint at Vasylivka.

The attack occurred hours before Russia formally annexed four regions of Ukraine, including Zaporizhzhia Oblast.

Reaction 
Vice-President of the European Commission Josep Borrell condemned the attack, tweeting, "Another heinous attack by Russia on civilians: this time a humanitarian convoy bringing vital help to people living in the non-government controlled areas of Zaporizhzhia." 

Ukrainian President Volodymyr Zelenskyy commented on the attack by calling Russia a "state-terrorist". The Zaporizhzhia regional prosecutor's office opened a criminal case act on the fact of violation of the laws and customs of warfare and premeditated murder. The Ukrainian authorities of the Zaporizhzhia region declared October 1 a day of mourning.

See also 
Zaporizhzhia residential building airstrike

References 

Russian war crimes in Ukraine
History of Zaporizhzhia
Mass murder in 2022
Airstrikes during the 2022 Russian invasion of Ukraine
War crimes during the 2022 Russian invasion of Ukraine
History of Zaporizhzhia Oblast
21st-century mass murder in Ukraine
Airstrikes conducted by Russia
September 2022 events in Ukraine